Acem may refer to:

 Acem Meditation
 The Turkish spelling for Ajam
 The Turkish spelling for the Ajam (maqam)
 Äcem Mosque